David P. Stief (January 29, 1956 – May 28, 2000) was American football wide receiver in the National Football League for the St. Louis Cardinals and the Washington Redskins. Born in Portland, Oregon, he played college football at Portland State University and was drafted in the seventh round of the 1978 NFL Draft.

Dave Stief played a key role in Mouse Davis’ early Run-and-Shoot offenses at Portland State. During his four seasons, Stief set PSU career records for most touchdown receptions (22) and most receiving yards (2,581). He also set a PSU season record for most touchdown catches in a season (12 in 1977). Stief made one of the most memorable catches in PSU history, the game-winning touchdown in the historic 50-49 win over Montana in 1976.

Despite being a role player as a receiver with the Cardinals, he recorded 24 catches for 477 yards and 4 TD as a rookie in 1978 along with completing 1 pass for 43 yards.  The next year, he hauled in 22 catches for 324 yards.  In 1980, he hauled in 16 catches for 165 yards.  In 1981, Stief mostly played special teams but recorded 5 catches for 77 yards and one touchdown.  After playing special teams in 1982, he moved on to the Washington Redskins in 1983 but retired after only playing 3 games.

He died in 2000 of esophageal cancer in Corbett, Oregon.

References

1956 births
2000 deaths
American football wide receivers
Portland State Vikings football players
St. Louis Cardinals (football) players
Washington Redskins players
Players of American football from Portland, Oregon